Jay M. Harding is an American sound engineer. He was nominated for two Academy Awards in the category Best Sound.

Selected filmography
 Fame (1980)
 Pennies from Heaven (1981)

References

External links

Year of birth missing (living people)
Living people
American audio engineers